William Edward Gompertz (born 25 August 1965) was the BBC's arts editor before moving to a position as the Barbican Centre’s Artistic Director from 1 June 2021.

Gompertz attended Dulwich Preparatory School, in Cranbrook, Kent.

Gompertz was previously director of Tate Media, and appeared in a show at the Edinburgh Fringe in 2009 called Double Art History. Gompertz has written extensively for The Guardian and The Times newspapers. He is the author of What Are You Looking At?: 150 Years of Modern Art in the Blink of an Eye and Think Like an Artist.

He is the son of general practitioner Hugh Gompertz OBE and a second cousin of Simon Gompertz, the personal finance correspondent to BBC News. He was born in Tenterden, Kent, and attended Bedford School. He did not take any A-levels.

Gompertz married Kate Anderson (daughter of Sir Eric Anderson) in 1993 and they have three sons and one daughter.

References

External links

 
 BBC blog

Living people
1965 births
People from Ashford, Kent
BBC newsreaders and journalists
British male journalists
People educated at Bedford School
English people of German descent
British people of German descent
British art critics